Beyond the Sundial is the second album from American new-age pianist Kevin Kern. As with his preceding and succeeding albums, it is an album of instrumental songs. It was released on April 8, 1997.

Track listing
All compositions by Kevin Kern.

"Beyond the Sundial" – 4:22
"Threads of Light" - 3:11
"Where Paths Meet" - 5:14
"A Flurry of Golden Leaves" - 3:33
"Kristen's Serenade" - 5:53
"A Time Remembered" - 4:17
"A Distant Shade of Green" - 3:19
"Into the Realm" - 5:15
"Sundial Awakening" - 4:08
"Hide and Seek" - 4:24
"Until Tomorrow" - 5:32

Liner Notes
Kevin's highly successful debut album, In the Enchanted Garden, has already garnered an appreciative following worldwide. His beautiful piano playing again captivates us, this time complemented by the exquisite oboe and English horn playing of Paul McCandless. With the simple elegance of a contemporary Chopin, Kevin's melodies effortlessly unfold glorious images of the enchantment which beckons from Beyond the Sundial.

Personnel 
Credits taken from the liner notes.

 Kevin Kern – piano, keyboards, producer, composer, arrangement
 Steve Dolan - digital photo manipulation
 Michele Bittner Haines - cover photograph
 Ron Hess - arrangement
 Ken Lee - mastering
 Cookie Marenco - recording, mixing
 Paul McCandless – oboe, English horn
 Kevin Wakefield - sound design
 Joe Tarantino - mastering
 Penny Wolin - artist photograph
 Andrea Yallop - art director
 Terence Yallop – executive producer

References

External links 
 
 Kevin Kern at Real Music

Beyond the Sundial
Kevin Kern albums